"10,000 Hours" is a song by American country music duo Dan + Shay and Canadian singer Justin Bieber. It was released on October 4, 2019, as the lead single from Dan + Shay's fourth studio album, Good Things (2021). Released four days after Justin and Hailey Bieber's wedding in South Carolina on September 30, the song was written by duo members Dan Smyers and Shay Mooney, Justin Bieber, Poo Bear, Jessie Jo Dillon, and Jordan Reynolds, and produced solely by Smyers. The song was named Best Country Duo/Group Performance at the 2021 Grammy Awards.

The song debuted at number four on the US Billboard Hot 100. It also made history on Billboard Streaming Songs chart by becoming the highest-charting non-holiday country song in the history of the chart, besting the number nine peak of Florida Georgia Line's "Cruise".

Composition
The song is set in the key of B-flat major with a tempo of 88-92 beats per minute. The track was described by Billboard as "mid-tempo".

Promotion
On September 29, Dan + Shay began teasing on social media that a track was arriving on October 4. They, as well as Justin Bieber, revealed the collaboration on October 2.

Commercial performance
"10,000 Hours" debuted at number four on the US Billboard Hot 100 which is the first country song to debut in the top ten since 2012. This is also Dan + Shay's first top ten hit in the US and Bieber's 16th. On the Country Airplay chart, it is the duo's seventh number one and Bieber's first. In its first full week of tracking, it received 33.3 million streams, and became the highest-charting non-holiday country song in the history of the streaming chart at number three. It also sold 53,000 downloads in first week, and it was the number one song on the Hot Country Songs chart. It sold a further 17,000 copies in the second week.  It was No. 1 for 21 weeks on the Hot Country Songs chart, the fourth longest reign in the chart history. It was certified Gold by the RIAA on December 10, 2019, and Platinum on January 16, 2020, later being certified quadruple platinum in 2021. It has sold 256,000 copies in the United States as of March 2020.

Piano version
On November 27, 2019, a piano version arrived of the track that was called as the wedding version. Dan + Shay and Justin Bieber switched parts in the song as well, but the lyrics are the same.

Credits and personnel
Credits adapted from Tidal.

 Dan Smyers – vocals, songwriter, producer, acoustic guitar, electric guitar, programmer, recording engineer, synthesizer
 Shay Mooney – vocals, songwriter
 Poo Bear – songwriter
 Justin Bieber - performer songwriter 
 Jordan Reynolds – songwriter, acoustic guitar, bass, electric guitar, piano, programmer, synthesizer
 Jessie Jo Dillon – songwriter
 Abby Smyers – backing vocals
 Bryan Sutton – acoustic guitar, mandolin, resonator guitar
 Jeff Balding – engineer
 Josh Gudwin – additional engineer, vocal producer
 Josh Ditty – additional engineer
 Andrew Mendelson – masterer
 Jeff Juliano – mixer

Awards and nominations

Charts

Weekly charts

Year-end charts

Certifications

Release history

References

2019 singles
2019 songs
2010s ballads
Dan + Shay songs
Justin Bieber songs
Warner Records Nashville singles
Vocal collaborations
Country ballads
Pop ballads
Songs written by Dan Smyers
Songs written by Justin Bieber
Songs written by Poo Bear
Songs written by Shay Mooney
Songs written by Jessie Jo Dillon
Songs written by Jordan Reynolds